Sankt Lorenzen im Mürztal is a municipality with 3674 inhabitants (as of January 1, 2021) in the judicial district of Bruck an der Mur and in the political district of Bruck-Mürzzuschlag in Styria, Austria.

Geography 
The centre of Sankt Lorenzen is at an altitude of 560 m above sea level. A., the highest point in the municipal area is the Töllmarkogel in the north at 1366 m above sea level.

Sankt Lorenzen im Mürztal is located northeast of the town of Kapfenberg. Other neighbouring communities are (clockwise) Parschlug, Turnau, Kindberg, Allerheiligen im Mürztal, Mürzhofen and Sankt Marein im Mürztal.

References

Cities and towns in Bruck-Mürzzuschlag District